Hargreaves Ogilvie Webster (born 1909, date of death unknown) was an illustrator and conservationist. He was born in Bunbury, Western Australia. He is noted as a contributing illustrator to Birds of Western Australia and for work to protect the fauna of the Southwest Australia ecoregion, especially the noisy scrub-bird (Atrichornis clamosus).

Webster attended Bunbury High School and Claremont Training College, and completed a degree in Art at the University of Western Australia in 1962. Webster was a Primary School teacher, retiring from that occupation as the Albany Primary School's headmaster in 1974 to pursue his interest in the ornithology. His research on the scrub-bird and other fauna of the region is associated with the establishment of Two Peoples Bay Nature Reserve.

References 

People from Western Australia
Australian natural history illustrators
1909 births
Year of death missing